The Consilium de Emendanda Ecclesia was a report commissioned by Pope Paul III on the abuses in the Catholic Church in 1536.

The commission appointed to review the abuses in the church was presided over by Gasparo Cardinal Contarini and consisted of eight additional cardinals: Girolamo Aleandro, Tommaso Badia, Giovanni Pietro Carafa (the later Pope Paul IV), Gregorio Cortese, Federigo Fregoso, Gianmatteo Giberti, Reginald Pole, and Jacopo Sadoleto. Their finished report was read to Paul III on 9 March 1537. It dealt mainly with the fiscal abuses of the papacy.

Paul III accepted the recommendations but did not commit himself to any immediate changes. The confidential report was published illegally in 1538 and enjoyed a wide circulation. Martin Luther published a German version, completed with sarcastic side margins. Johannes Sturm approached the Consilium more seriously, applauding the effort made by the Catholic Church to abolish some of its most pressing abuses, but showing great concern whether the church could revitalize itself without giving greater importance to the Gospel.

The Consilium de emendanda ecclesia was never put into effect, although many of the proposed changes were implemented in later reforms.

External links 
 Consilium de Emendanda Ecclesia, Romæ, 1538.
 Consilium de emendanda ecclesia (1537), Part I, Societas Christiana (1.0), Tim Enloe 

1538 books
16th-century Christian texts
16th-century Catholicism
16th-century Latin books
Books about Christianity
Pope Paul III